Max Air is a domestic and international airline based in Nigeria, the country's longest-serving international airline. Established in 2008 by business mogul Alhaji Dahiru Barau Mangal, the company's head office is located in Kano State with its base at Mallam Aminu Kano International Airport, Kano.

History
Max Air is one of Nigeria's leading airlines, operating a domestic, regional and international flight network. The airline was established in 2006 as Mangal Airlines an rebranded Max Air in 2008 operating its first commercial flight to King Abdulaziz International Airport from Kano.  The airline began its operations with two Boeing 747-400 aircraft for its Umrah and Hajj operation services. In June 2018, Max Air began domestic operations to three destinations which include Abuja, Lagos from the airline's main hub (Kano). On November 1, 2018, Max Air announces two new routes to its domestic operations which include Port Harcourt and Yola as part of its expansion drive. On November 5, Maiduguri route was launched by the airline, making it the 6th domestic destination to its operational routes.

Destinations
Max Air is being operating in seven domestic and 2 international scheduled destinations in states across Nigeria and the Middle East (as of August 2019).

Fleet

As of October 2021, the Max Air fleet consists of the following aircraft:

In-flight services
On July 11, 2019, Max Air launches its first in-flight quarterly magazine titled In-flight Magazine which is the first of its kind in Nigeria's domestic aviation industry history. Max Air In-flight Magazine is published by Zamkah Technologies Limited, an international company based in Nigeria, which is a Nigerian privately owned business.

References

External links
 

Airlines established in 2008
Organizations based in Kano
Airlines of Nigeria
Transport in Kano
Charter airlines